Pseudochromis mooii, the Mooi's dottyback, is a species of ray-finned fish from  Indonesia, which is a member of the family Pseudochromidae.

Etymology
The fish is named in honor of Randall D. Mooi, the Curator of Zoology at the Manitoba Museum in Winnipeg, Manitoba, Canada.

References

Gill, A.C., 2004. Revision of the Indo-Pacific dottyback fish subfamily Pseudochrominae (Perciformes: Pseudochromidae). Smith. Monogr. (1):1-213.

mooii
Taxa named by Anthony C. Gill
Fish described in 2004